The title Conference-USA Championship Game may refer to several sporting events that are sponsored by the Conference USA.
 Conference USA Football Championship Game crowns the champion of the C-USA football season.
 Conference USA men's basketball tournament crowns the champion of the C-USA men's basketball season.
 Conference USA women's basketball tournament crowns the champion of the C-USA women's basketball season.